The 2010 Bethune–Cookman Wildcats football team represented Bethune-Cookman University as a member of the Mid-Eastern Athletic Conference (MEAC) during the 2010 NCAA Division I FCS football season. The Wildcats were led by first-year head coach Brian Jenkins and played their home games at Municipal Stadium. They finished the season 10–2 overall and 7–1 in MEAC play, sharing the conference title with South Carolina State. Bethune–Cookman was invited to the NCAA Division I Football Championship playoffs, where they received a first-round bye before losing to New Hampshire in the second round.

Schedule

References

Bethune–Cookman
Bethune–Cookman Wildcats football seasons
Bethune–Cookman
Mid-Eastern Athletic Conference football champion seasons
Bethune–Cookman Wildcats football